Islotes Blancos, is an island in the Gulf of California east of the Baja California Peninsula. The island is uninhabited and is part of the Mexicali Municipality.

Biology
Islotes Blancos has only one species of  reptile, the Enchanted Side-blotched Lizard (Uta encantadae).

References

http://herpatlas.sdnhm.org/places/overview/islotes-blancos/123/1/

Islands of Mexicali Municipality
Islands of Baja California
Islands of the Gulf of California
Uninhabited islands of Mexico